The Men's marathon 4 was a wheelchair marathon event in athletics at the 1988 Summer Paralympics. It was contested by seventeen athletes from eleven countries.

Results

See also
 Marathon at the Paralympics

References 

Men's marathon 4
1988 marathons
Marathons at the Paralympics
Men's marathons